The Lac Bureau is a vast freshwater body of the southwestern part of the Gouin Reservoir, in the territory of the town of La Tuque, in Haute-Mauricie, in the administrative region of Mauricie, in the province of Quebec, in Canada.

This lake extends in the cantons of Le May, Evanturel, Myrand, Achintre and Sulte. Following the erection completed in 1948 of the Gouin dam, the current shape of the "Lac Bureau" was shaped by the raising of the waters of the Gouin reservoir. The water level varies significantly, being dependent on the water management of the Gouin Dam erected in 1948.

Recreotourism activities are the main economic activity of the sector. Forestry comes second.

The route 404 serves the Oskélanéo River Valley and South Zone of South Bay of Bureau Lake. A forest road branch serves the west side of the latter bay.

The surface of Lake Bureau is usually frozen from mid-November to the end of April, however, safe ice circulation is generally from early December to the end of March.

Geography

Toponymy
A map dating from 1924 has three distinct water bodies, not connected to each other, on the site of the present Lake Bureau. The gradual raising of water, caused by the creation of the Gouin Reservoir in 1948, led to the merger of the Great South Lake and the lakes of the North and East, creating a new lake entity.

This hydronym which has been official since 1935, evokes the work of life of Joseph Bureau (1837-1914). Born in L'Ancienne-Lorette, in the suburbs of Quebec City, this explorer-cartographer has greatly contributed to pushing back the frontiers of Quebec topographic knowledge by traversing it in all directions, from Labrador at Outaouais and St. Lawrence River at Hudson Bay. His services were retained in particular in 1870 to establish the best route for the construction of a railway to the Lac Saint-Jean and Mauricie.

The following year, it goes back with John Bignell the Saint-Maurice to its source, the "lake of the Male", now integrated into Gouin reservoir.

In 1872, Bureau agreed to direct the maneuver floating logs on this river. For a long time associated with the cure Labelle for the opening of territories favorable to the colonization of the north, it is interested then with the establishment of a railway since Quebec (city) as far as the Atlantic coast, then explores a large part of the Côte-Nord. Until the end of his  life, Joseph Bureau remained active. Lake Bureau also bears the name Attikamek Opiskaw Sakahikan, High Lake.

The toponym "Lac Bureau" was formalized on December 18, 1986, by the [Commission de toponymie du Quebec].

Notes and references

See also 

Lakes of Mauricie
La Tuque, Quebec